A warlock  is a male practitioner of witchcraft.

Etymology and terminology
The most commonly accepted etymology derives warlock from the Old English wǣrloga, which meant "breaker of oaths" or "deceiver" and was given special application to the devil around 1000. In early modern Scots, the word came to be used as the male equivalent of witch (which can be male or female, but has historically been used predominantly for females). The term may have become associated in Scotland with male witches due to the idea that they had made pacts with Auld Hornie (the devil) and thus had betrayed the Christian faith and broke their baptismal vows or oaths. From this use, the word passed into Romantic literature and ultimately 20th-century popular culture. A derivation from the Old Norse varð-lokkur, "caller of spirits", has also been suggested, but the Oxford English Dictionary  considers this implausible due to the extreme rarity of the Norse word and because forms without hard -k, which are consistent with the Old English etymology ("traitor"), are attested earlier than forms with a -k.

History
Although most victims of the witch trials in early modern Scotland were women, some men were executed as warlocks.

In his day, the mathematician John Napier was often perceived as a warlock or magician for his interest in divination and the occult, though his established position likely kept him from being prosecuted.

References

Supernatural legends
European witchcraft
Rebels